Machines Like Me is the 15th novel by the English author Ian McEwan. The novel was published in 2019 by Jonathan Cape. 

The novel is set in the 1980s in an alternative history timeline in which the UK lost the Falklands War, Alan Turing is still alive, and the Internet, social media, and self-driving cars already exist. The story revolves around an android named Adam and its/his relationship with its/his owners, Charlie and Miranda, which involves the formation of a love triangle.

Reception 
According to review aggregator website Bookmarks, critical reception was mostly positive. Writing for The New York Times, Jeff Giles notes, "It is not the first, or even the 10th, place to start reading McEwan if you've never encountered him before. Yet he's such a masterly writer of prose and provocative thinker of thoughts that even his lesser novels leave marks. 'Machines' is a sharp, unsettling read, which—despite its arteries being clogged with research and back story—has a lot on its mind about love, family, jealousy and deceit. Ultimately, it asks a surprisingly mournful question: If we built a machine that could look into our hearts, could we really expect it to like what it sees?" Similarly positive, Ron Charles, for The Washington Post, concludes that McEwan "is not only one of the most elegant writers alive, he is one of the most astute at crafting moral dilemmas within the drama of everyday life. True, contending with an attractive synthetic rival is a problem most of us won't have to deal with anytime soon (sorry, Alexa), but figuring out how to treat each other, how to do some good in the world, how to create a sense of value in our lives, these are problems no robot will ever solve for us." Heller McAlpin, for NPR, concludes by praising how the book "also manages to flesh out—literally and grippingly—questions about what constitutes a person, and the troubling future of humans if the smart machines we create can overtake us."

References

2019 British novels
British alternative history novels
Jonathan Cape books
Novels about androids
Novels by Ian McEwan
Novels set in the 1980s
Rape in fiction